Selwyn Davies Whalley (24 February 1934 – 8 August 2008) is an English former footballer. A right-back, he was a one club man with a fifteen-year career at Port Vale. He made 196 league and cup appearances for the club, before he was forced to retire due to a foot injury in May 1966. He helped the club to win the Fourth Division title in 1958–59. He spent the majority of his career as a part-time player, whilst also working as a teacher.

Whalley died on 8 August 2008, at the age of 74, following an 18-month battle against prostate cancer. He was survived by wife Lesley, son Martyn, daughters Joanne and Philippa and grandson Daniel. He died days apart from former teammate Ken Griffiths.

Career
Whalley was born in Tunstall, Stoke-on-Trent, and grew up supporting Port Vale. He joined his boyhood club as a professional in August 1953, he made his debut at right-half in a 3–2 defeat by Bristol Rovers on 13 April 1957 at Vale Park. He went on to play five further Second Division games in the 1956–57 season, as Norman Low's "Valiants" suffered relegation into the Third Division South. However, after taking up a teaching position in September 1957 his opportunities were limited. His teaching duties limited him to 13 appearances in 1957–58, though he did score his first senior goal on 8 March, in a 5–0 home win over Watford. At the end of the season a re-structuring of the Football League meant that Vale became founder members of the Fourth Division.

An example of his teaching duties got in the way of his footballing career was on Monday, 8 September 1958, when he played in the 5–0 win by Hartlepool United at Victoria Park, arriving back the next morning just in time to start his first class at Hanley High School. He played a total of 11 games in 1958–59, as the club won the Fourth Division title. He made 12 Third Division appearances in 1959–60, finding the net twice in a 4–3 defeat to Newport County at Somerton Park on 19 October. He played 14 games in 1960–61, scoring twice in a 3–2 win over Brentford on 3 October and once in a 4–3 win over Bristol City at Ashton Gate Stadium five days later.

Whalley played 48 games in 1961–62, scoring once in a 1–0 home win over Notts County on 25 September. However he was limited to 21 games in 1962–63, after new boss Freddie Steele took charge of the club and led the Vale to within four points of promotion. He managed to make 47 appearances in the 1963–64 campaign, finding the net once in a 2–1 win over Bradford City at Valley Parade in an FA Cup First Round win on 16 November. He went on to feature in the Vale's Fourth Round goalless draw with Liverpool at Anfield in front of 52,327 supporters; the "Reds" won the replay 2–1. Whalley featured 16 times in 1964–65, as the club suffered relegation under new boss Jackie Mudie. He made seven Fourth Division appearances in 1965–66, before he retired in May 1966 due to a foot injury. He shared a testimonial game with Roy Sproson two years earlier. He made 196 appearances and scored eight goals in all competitions during his 13 years in Burslem.

Career statistics
Source:

Honours
Port Vale
Football League Fourth Division: 1958–59

References

1934 births
2008 deaths
People from Tunstall, Staffordshire
Schoolteachers from Staffordshire
Footballers from Stoke-on-Trent
People educated at Hanley High School
English footballers
Association football defenders
Port Vale F.C. players
English Football League players
Deaths from prostate cancer
Deaths from cancer in England